Punjabi Cinema Golden Honors is a celebration of the rich heritage of Punjabi film and entertainment industry. It works towards honoring those artists who have helped the industry scale its current heights. Ratesh Gupta is the founder of Punjabi Cinema Golden Honours & Film Festival. Punjabi honors will create a common platform where legends, present stars, and future artists will come together and share the same space.

Concept
Seminar to be conducted with a panel of experts from the industry and the media on the growth and technical advancement of Punjabi cinema. Screening of Punjabi short films and documentaries to create an audience for the genre. Celebration Night to honor the veterans and Contemporary stars who have dedicated their lives to Punjabi Cinema.

Idea 
The Punjabi Cinema Golden Honors is an occasion to celebrate Punjabi films and artists who have dedicated their lives to the growth of the industry. We aim to promote both mainstream and parallel Punjabi Cinema. Work of new and upcoming filmmakers will also be showcased along with documentaries made in Punjabi. We wish to educate the audience about the rich heritage and legacy of Punjabi Cinema so that they can feel proud of being associated with the cinema of their region and the journey of its success.

Honors
The Golden Honors concept is more to do with cooperation rather than competition. We wish to honor the people who have contributed to the success and development of Punjabi Cinema and helped the industry scale its current heights.

Film festival
The event is first of kind ever held in the history of Punjabi cinema to promote the fresh talent and showcase their work. The selection of work being showcased will be at the sole discretion of the panel headed by the eminent personalities of the industry. In addition, to this we are holding a symposium on Punjabi cinema where the big stalwarts of industry media personalities and the students belong to Fraternity of Cinema will share a common platform and participate in open discussion of cinema now and then.

References

Hindi cinema